Debbie Linden (22 February 1961 – 6 October 1997) was a Scottish-born glamour model and actress best known for her career in England, especially her role as old Mr Grace's secretary in the sitcom Are You Being Served? (1981). Born in Glasgow, she played roles in various other TV series, such as The Professionals, Just Good Friends, Bergerac, and The Bill; she appeared in several feature films, among them Home Before Midnight and The Wildcats of St Trinian's.

Linden was plagued with a drug problem for years. On the night of 5 October 1997, she died of a heroin overdose at home at the age of 36. Her boyfriend, Russell Ainsworth, was acquitted of manslaughter charges but sentenced to two-and-a-half years for supplying the drug.

Film credits
 Home Before Midnight (1979) as Carol
 The Wildcats of St Trinian's (1980) as Mavis
 Bloodbath at the House of Death (1984) as Attractive girl
 Eat the Rich (1987) as  Layla

TV credits
 The Benny Hill Show (1978)
 Dick Emery's Comedy Hour (1979)
 The Professionals (1979; Bodie's Girl)
 The Ghost Sonata (TV film) (1980; as Milkmaid)
 Cowboys (1980; as Doreen)
 The Jim Davidson Show (1981)
 Are You Being Served? (1981; as Old Mr Grace's secretary)
 Don't Rock the Boat (TV series) (1982; as Melanie) 
 The Kenny Everett Television Show (1981)
 Just Good Friends (1984; as Brenda)
 The Kid (TV series) (1986; as the Blonde Girl)
 The Dame Edna Experience (1987 Christmas special episode "The Dame Edna Christmas Experience"; as Debbie)
 Bergerac (1991; as Margie)
 The Bill (1994; as Mrs Petty)

Video release
 The Kenny Everett Naughty Joke Box (1981)

Discography
 The Kenny Everett Naughty Joke-Box (1984)
Vinyl Album (catalogue ref LAX LP 101) on Relax Records. https://www.discogs.com/Kenny-Everett-Naughty-Joke-Box/release/3849723

References

External links 
 

1961 births
1997 deaths
20th-century Scottish actresses
Actresses from Glasgow
Deaths by heroin overdose in England
Glamour models
Scottish female models
Scottish film actresses
Scottish television actresses